This is a list of Scottish football transfers featuring at least one 2018–19 Scottish Premiership club or one 2018–19 Scottish Championship club which were completed after the summer 2018 transfer window closed and before the end of the 2018–19 season.

List

See also
 List of Scottish football transfers summer 2018
 List of Scottish football transfers summer 2019

References

Transfers
Scottish
2018 in Scottish sport
2018 winter
2019 in Scottish sport